EF Language (also known as Illbruck, Magnavox 2UE,  Nokia 2UE,  Nokia,  DHL) is a Volvo Ocean 60 yacht that won the 1997–98 Whitbread Round the World Race.

Career
EF Language was designed by Bruce Farr and built by Richard Gilles and Tim Smythe.

She won the 1997–98 Whitbread Round the World Race skippered by Paul Cayard.

She competed in the 2000 Sydney to Hobart Yacht Race as illbruck and in the 2003 Sydney to Hobart Yacht Race as Nokia 2UE

References

Volvo Ocean 60 yachts
Volvo Ocean Race yachts
Sydney to Hobart Yacht Race yachts
Sailing yachts of Australia
Sailing yachts of Sweden
Sailing yachts designed by Bruce Farr
1990s sailing yachts
1997 ships